West Finchley is a London Underground station in the Finchley area of the London Borough of Barnet. The station is on the High Barnet branch of the Northern line between Woodside Park and Finchley Central stations and is in Travelcard Zone 4.

History
The station was opened by the London & North Eastern Railway (LNER) on 1 March 1933 on its line to High Barnet. It opened to serve new housing developing in the area and was built with only modest station structures from the outset. Many fittings were taken from stations in the north of England. It has been written that the footbridge came from Wintersett and Ryhill on the Barnsley Coal Railway in Yorkshire, which had closed in 1930. However, that footbridge looks different and Jago Hazzard speculates that it actually came from the next station on that line, Notton and Royston.

The section of the High Barnet branch north of East Finchley was incorporated into the London Underground network through the "Northern Heights" project begun in the late 1930s. West Finchley station was first served by Northern line trains on 14 April 1940 and, after a period where the station was serviced by both operators, LNER services ended in 1941.

Local information

The main entrance is in Nether Street; there is a small front garden between the pavement and the building containing the booking office, though it is not accessible to the public (there are high fences on each side of the path).  Access to the northbound platform by wheelchair and with push-chair is straightforward, though it is necessary to cross a footbridge to reach the southbound platform.  Although there is an entrance directly onto the south-bound platform, it is only open during the morning rush hour. This small entrance was closed for security reasons during the weeks following the 7 July 2005 London bombings although it has now reopened.

Ticket office closure
London Underground Limited announced in June 2007 that due to reduced demand for tickets bought from ticket offices (as opposed to from machines) around 40 of the most lightly used ticket offices at Tube stations will close from March 2008. The list of stations includes West Finchley.

Services and connections
Train frequencies vary throughout the day, but generally operate every 3–7 minutes between 06:09 and 00:13 in both directions.

London Bus routes 13, 125, 221, 326 460, 683 and night route N20 serves nearby the station.

Gallery

References

External links

London Transport Museum Photographic Archive

Northern line stations
Tube stations in the London Borough of Barnet
Former London and North Eastern Railway stations
Railway stations in Great Britain opened in 1933
Finchley
London Underground Night Tube stations